The 3rd IAAF World Half Marathon Championships was held on September 24, 1994, in Oslo, Norway. A total of 214 athletes, 127 men and 87 women, from 48 countries took part.

Complete results were published.

Medallists

Race Results

Men's

Women's

Team Results

Men's

Women's

Participation
The participation of 214 athletes (127 men/87 women) from 48 countries is reported.

 (5)
 (3)
 (8)
 (3)
 (1)
 (3)
 (5)
 (3)
 (2)
 (4)
 (1)
 (4)
 (9)
 (9)
 (5)
 (3)
 (2)
 (4)
 (3)
 (1)
 (3)
 (9)
 (3)
 (5)
 (4)
 (4)
 (3)
 (9)
 (3)
 (4)
 (10)
 (1)
 (7)
 (4)
 (10)
 (1)
 (10)
 (1)
 (3)
 (5)
 (1)
 (5)
 (1)
 (9)
 (10)
 (3)
 (3)
 (5)

See also
1994 in athletics (track and field)

References

External links
IAAF World Half Marathon Championships 1992-2005 Facts & Figures

IAAF World Half Marathon Championships
Half Marathon Championships
World Athletics Half Marathon Championships
Athletics
September 1994 sports events in Europe
1990s in Oslo
International sports competitions in Oslo